Jacques Spitz (1 October 1896, in Nemours [now Ghazaouet, Algeria] – 16 January 1963, in Paris) was a French novelist.

Spitz was an engineer; he wrote several science fiction novels which were greatly influential in European science fiction. Cynical, ironic, often pessimist, influenced by Surrealism, his style is reminiscent of Pierre Boulle's. Although some of his novels were reissued in France
, he is mostly forgotten and his novels are very difficult to find, even in France. However, some of his works has been translated into Italian: L'œil du purgatoire, L'Homme Élastique, La Guerre des Mouches, and Les Signaux du Soleil (the latter being published in 2009).  At least one novel was translated into Swedish: L'Agonie du Globe (När jorden rämnade, 1937). Two of his novels were translated into Greek: Les Évadés de l'an 4000 (Οι Δραπέτες του 4.000 μΧ, 1971) and L'Expérience du Dr. Mops (Κραυγή από το Μέλλον, 1971)

His masterworks are considered to be La guerre des mouches, L'homme élastique, and L'œil du purgatoire. The latter, meaning "The Eye of Purgatory", is about a man whose eyes, due to an exotic bacterium, start to see things as they will appear in the future.

Works
La Croisière Indécise (1926)
La Mise en Plis (1928)
Le Vent du Monde (1928)
Le Voyage Muet (1930)
Les Dames de Velours (1933)
L'Agonie du Globe (1935)
Les Évadés de l'an 4000 (1936)
L'Homme Élastique (1938)
La Guerre des Mouches (1938)
L'Expérience du Dr. Mops (1939) (translated by Brian Stableford in The Eye of Purgatory (2010) )
La Parcelle "Z" (1942)
Les Signaux du Soleil (1943)
L'Œil du Purgatoire (1945) (translated by Brian Stableford in The Eye of Purgatory (2010) )
La Forêt des Sept-Pies (1946)
Albine au Poitrail (1956)

References

Most of this article has been taken from the French Wikipedia article about Jacques Spitz.
Afterword of Incubi perfetti, the Italian edition of La guerre des mouches and L'homme élastique (Mondadori, Urania), #1510, May 2006).

External links
A review of L'Œil du Purgatoire by Denis Philippe  
An article from Figaro Littéraire of 8 April 1950 (in French)
A list of French science fiction authors from Jules Verne to René Barjavel 
"French Science Fiction: The Occluded Genre"
" Search the last edition in France''  

1896 births
1963 deaths
People from Ghazaouet
Pieds-Noirs
French science fiction writers
French male novelists
20th-century French novelists
20th-century French male writers